László Toroczkai (born László Tóth, 10 March 1978) is a Hungarian politician, journalist, leader of the Our Homeland Movement political party, and former mayor of Ásotthalom. He is also a member of the Parliamentary Assembly of the Council of Europe. He is also a founding member of the HVIM youth organization, the Hunnia national radical movement, and former Vice President of Jobbik. Between 2002 and 2013 he served as editor-in-chief of the Magyar Jelen newspaper.

Family
The Treaty of Trianon heavily impacted on his family. Ancestors from his mother's side were expelled from Rimetea and Cluj-Napoca; ancestors from his father's side were expelled from Sombor and Odžaci. As a fearful judge, one of his great-grandfathers, had a major role in the aftermath of the failed Hungarian Revolution of 1956 and was widely condemned for presiding over some of the notorious show trials. It was he who convicted Mária Wittner among others. Conservative right author Anna Tutsek, who was born in Cluj-Napoca, was also his relative. In the 1930s his grandfather, László Tóth, who was from Bačka, was a gendarme and a football player. Later on, during World War II, he served in the Royal Hungarian Army. He was deployed to recapture Bačka and Northern Transylvania and then participated in fights at the Eastern front.

László Toroczkai has 3 children. He was twice married. His second wife is from Western Moldavia, Romania. They divorced in 2017.

Political career
Born in Szeged, Toroczkai studied communication at the University of Szeged. He defines himself as a national radical.

In 2004, Toroczkai was banned from Serbia after being involved in a scuffle with a group of Serbs  in the town of Palić. In 2006, the authorities of Slovakia also banned him from the country for five years because of demonstrations that he organized in front of the Slovak Ministry of Internal Affairs. He became a nationally known political figure during the 2006 protests in Hungary and especially because of his role in the siege of the headquarters of Magyar Televízió, the Hungarian public television where he led the protesting crowd in Budapest from the Kossuth Square to the Liberty Square.

Mayor of Ásotthalom (2013–present)
Since 2013 he has been the mayor of Ásotthalom. He was elected as mayor in a by-election with 71.5% of the vote. In the regularly scheduled election in 2014 he was re-elected unanimously. He was re-elected with 68.42% of the vote in the 2019 local elections.

It was his idea early 2015 to have a border fence built along the southern border of Hungary, in order to stop illegal migration, which was later implemented as the Hungarian border barrier the same year by the Hungarian government. During the 2015 European migrant crisis, over 10,000 Syrian and Iraqi migrants passed through the village, with only a handful of them aiming to settle there. In 2017, only two Muslims were known to choose Ásotthalom as their permanent residence. There are no mosque-designed structures built in the village up to date and Toroczkai banned any building of mosques that year. In addition, the local government had banned the Muslim call to prayer, Muslim clothing, and public displays of same-sex affection. He endorsed policies to ban the promotion of pro-LGBT rights advertisements and Islamic religious practices in Ásotthalom, arguing that homosexuality and Islam are threats posed to the Hungarian traditions. In April 2017, after a lawsuit challenging the ban's legitimacy had been filled, the Constitutional Court struck it down, ruling that it violated human rights law as it aimed to " directly limit the freedom of speech, conscience and religion".

In June 2018, Toroczkai discussed plans with Afrikaner farmers to relocate to Ásotthalom.

Party leader

Between 2010 and 2014, he was a local representative of Csongrád County. He is the former vice president of the Jobbik party and led its county list during the elections of 2010 and 2014.

After the 2018 Hungarian parliamentary election, Toroczkai was a contender for Jobbik's presidency, but he lost to his opponent Tamás Sneider, receiving 46.2% of the vote. He later told reporters he had formed a new platform and allowed party leaders time until June 23 to integrate its ideology and policies into the party's political programmes or risk a break-up of Jobbik.

He said the platform had plans to return to the original goals pursued by Jobbik, including to halt immigration, stop the emigration of the Hungarian youth to the wealthier western part of the EU, take a tough line on Hungary's Roma minority, and to support the ethnic Hungarian minorities in neighboring states.

On 8 June 2018, Jobbik withdrew Toroczkai's membership and excluded him from the party. In response, he established a new political movement which formed into a party called Our Homeland Movement with fellow former Jobbik MP Dóra Dúró.

In 2022 parliamentary elections, Mi Hazank got above 5% threshold to enter parliament with 6%, winning 7 seats.

References

External links

Hungarian far-right figure attacked in Serbia

1978 births
Living people
Critics of Islam
Jobbik politicians
Our Homeland Movement politicians
21st-century Hungarian politicians
Mayors of places in Hungary
Hungarian nationalists
Hungarian anti-communists
Far-right politics in Hungary
People from Csongrád-Csanád County
Members of the National Assembly of Hungary (2022–2026)